Snuffbox Immanence is an album by the Japanese band Ghost. It was released by Drag City in 1999. The band also released Tune In, Turn On, Free Tibet on the same day.

The album features a cover version of "Live With Me", originally by The Rolling Stones.

Track listing
All songs written by Masaki Batoh unless otherwise indicated.

 "Regenesis"
 "Live with Me" (Jagger, Richards)
 "Soma"
 "Daggma"
 "Snuffbox Immanence"
 "Obiit 1961"
 "Tempera Tune"
 "Fukeiga"
 "Sad Shakers"
 "Hanmiyau"

1999 albums
Ghost (1984 band) albums
Drag City (record label) albums